Chris McLernon is an American musician who is best known as the current bassist of the band Saigon Kick from 1992–1997 and 2012– present.

Before joining Saigon Kick Chris played in Cold Sweat and the premiere Kiss tribute band Cold Gin, which also featured one time Cold Sweat band-mate Anthony White, Black 'N Blue vocalist extraordinaire Jaime St. James and current Kiss member Tommy Thayer.

Joining Saigon Kick in July 1992, McLernon replaced Tom Defile as their second album The Lizard hit the stores. Saigon Kick then toured non-stop for the next eleven months, as the single "Love Is On The Way" and The Lizard album both went gold. 

McLernon then recorded with the band on their third album Water, in Stockholm, Sweden and Tampa, Florida.

Water had three number one singles in Indonesia, leading to a sold-out tour in 1994. The follow up Devil in the Details was recorded in Tampa, Florida and released in 1995. It also charted globally leading to another successful tour of the Pacific Rim and Europe.

After Saigon Kick, Chris went on to develop a company called McLernon MultiMedia that has placed music with all of the major broadcast and cable networks, major advertising firms and indie films. He also fronts a surf instrumental band called Big Mick and The Curl which has charted internationally and heard in the Showtime program Homeland. 

Chris also plays guitar and produced Mother Mary with vocalist Robert Basauri (Red Sea, Die Happy), pianist Vince Gilbert (The Cult, D’Priest) and drummer Rick Sanders (Saigon Kick, Super Transatlantic).

On May 7, 2019, it was announced that Cold Sweat was reuniting with all original members on the 2020 Monsters of Rock Cruise.

Discography

With Cold Sweat
Break Out (1990)

Saigon Kick
Water (1993)
Devil In The Details (1995)
Bastards (1997)

External links
chrismclernon.com

American rock bass guitarists
Saigon Kick members
Year of birth missing (living people)
Living people
American male bass guitarists